Adenomera andreae (common name: lowland tropical bullfrog) is a species of frogs in the family Leptodactylidae.

It is found in the lowlands of northern South America east of the Andes (Bolivia, Brazil, Colombia, Ecuador, French Guiana, Guyana, Peru, Suriname, and Venezuela). As currently defined, it probably represents a cryptic species complex, comprising perhaps four species.

Description
Dorsum is grayish brown to beige, occasionally with dark brown spots, and rarely with a vertebral dark brown stripe and/or dorsolateral orangish yellow stripe. The ventral surfaces are white. Iris is chestnut.

Eggs are laid in foam nests on the ground. Tadpoles are terrestrial: they are endotrophic and develop in the nest. Recruitment of juveniles is synchronized with rainfall.

Its predators include large tarantulas.

Habitat
Its natural habitats are tropical moist lowland forests, but it can also be found in open environments such as grasslands surrounded by forest habitats. It is threatened by habitat loss from clear cutting.

References

Adenomera
Amphibians of Bolivia
Amphibians of Colombia
Amphibians of Ecuador
Amphibians of French Guiana
Amphibians of Guyana
Amphibians of Peru
Amphibians of Suriname
Amphibians of Venezuela
Amphibians described in 1923
Taxonomy articles created by Polbot